"Take What You Want" is a song by American rapper and singer Post Malone, featuring vocals from English singer-songwriter Ozzy Osbourne and fellow American rapper and singer Travis Scott. The song was written by the artists, Billy Walsh, and producers Louis Bell and Andrew Watt. The song appears on Malone's third studio album, Hollywood's Bleeding (2019), and later appeared on Osbourne's twelfth studio album Ordinary Man (2020). The song was serviced to US contemporary hit radio on October 15, 2019, as the sixth single from the aforementioned album.

It is the first collaboration between Malone and Osbourne, which was later followed by Osbourne's single, "It's a Raid", from his album Ordinary Man in February 2020. An official live performance video was released to promote the single.

"Take What You Want" peaked at number eight on the US Billboard Hot 100.

Commercial performance
"Take What You Want" became Malone's ninth top 10 on the Billboard Hot 100, debuting at number eight and becoming Osbourne's first Billboard Hot 100 top 10 in over 30 years, making it the longest gap between top 10 appearances.

Personnel
Credits adapted from Tidal.

 Post Malone – principal vocalist, songwriting
 Ozzy Osbourne – vocalist, songwriting
 Travis Scott – vocalist, songwriting
 Andrew Watt – production, songwriting, lead guitar
 Louis Bell – recording, production, vocal production
 Billy Walsh – songwriting
 Chad Smith – drums
 Paul Lamalfa – recording
 Manny Marroquin – mixing
 Chris Galland – mixing assistance
 Robin Florent – mixing assistance
 Scott Desmarais – mixing assistance
 Mike Bozzi – mastering

Charts

Certifications

Release history

References

External links

2019 songs
2019 singles
Post Malone songs
Ozzy Osbourne songs
Travis Scott songs
Songs written by Louis Bell
Songs written by Post Malone
Songs written by Ozzy Osbourne
Songs written by Travis Scott
Songs written by Andrew Watt (record producer)
Song recordings produced by Louis Bell
Republic Records singles
Rap rock songs